Baal Shiv – Mahadev Ki Andekhi Gatha is an Indian Hindi-language mythology series produced by Anirudh Pathak under the banner of Zee Studio. It was premiered on 23 November 2021 on And TV. It stars Aan Tiwari and Trisha Sarda in lead roles of Baal Shiv and Baal Parvati. Siddharth Arora, Shivya Pathania and Mouli Ganguly appear in pivotal roles.

Premise
The show revolves around the story of Anasuya, the wife of sage Atri and her motherhood as she transformed Shiva into a baby when the latter, along with Brahma and Vishnu had come to test her virtue and chastity.

Cast

Main 
 Aan Tiwari as Baal Shiv 
Siddharth Arora as God Shiva
 Trisha Sarda as Baal Parvati
Shivya Pathania as Goddess Parvati, adi shakti, kattyayni, Durga, mahakali, Kali, Tara, lalita, bhuvaneshwari, bhairavi, chinnomostha, dhumavati, bagalamukhi, matangi, kamalatmika, satakshi, sati, bhadrakali, 64 yogini, kaushiki, chamunda
 Mouli Ganguly as Mahasati Anasuya

Recurring 
 Rajeev Bhardwaj / Sandeep Mohan as Maharishi Atri
 Kapil Nirmal as Maharaj Tarakasur
 Kunal Bakshi as Devraj Indra
 Shrashti Maheshwari as Rajkumari Ajamukhi
 Nazea Hasan Sayed as Devi Saraswati
 Deepika Upadhyay as Devi Lakshmi
 Praneet Bhat as Devrishi Narada
 Jaya Bhattacharya as Maharani Mainavati
 Sunil Singh as Shukracharya
 Krip Suri as Andhaka
 Danish Akhtar Saifi as Nandi
 Tej Sapru as Maharaj Daksha

References

2021 Indian television series debuts
Hindi-language television shows
Indian television series about Hindu deities
&TV original programming